Chibs may refer to:
 Chibs Telford, a fictional character in the Sons of Anarchy TV series

See also 
 Chib (disambiguation)